The 1950 All-Southwest Conference football team consists of American football players chosen by various organizations for All-Southwest Conference teams for the 1950 college football season.  The selectors for the 1950 season included the Associated Press (AP) and the United Press (UP).  Players selected as first-team players by both the AP and UP are designated in bold.

All Southwest selections

Backs
 Larry Isbell, Baylor (AP-1, UP-1 [quarterback])
 Byron Townsend, Texas (AP-1, UP-1 [fullback])
 Bob Smith, Texas A&M (AP-1, UP-1 [fullback])
 Kyle Rote, SMU (AP-1, UP-1 [halfback])
 Gilbert Bartosh, Texas Christian (AP-2)
 Ben Tompkins, Texas (AP-2)
 Bill Tidwell, Texas A&M (AP-2)
 Fred Benners, SMU (AP-2)

Ends
 Harold Riley, Baylor (AP-1, UP-1)
 Andy Hillhouse, Texas A&M (AP-2, UP-1)
 Ben Procter, Texas (AP-1)
 Bill Howton, Rice (AP-2)

Tackles
 Ken Jackson, Texas (AP-1, UP-1)
 Paul Giroski, Rice (AP-1, UP-1)
 Bobby Collier, SMU (AP-2)
 Clarence "Red" Marable, Texas Christian (AP-2)

Guards
 Bud McFadin, Texas (AP-1, UP-1)
 Dave Hanner, Arkansas (AP-1, UP-1)
 Herschel Forester, SMU (AP-2)
 Max Greiner, Texas A&M (AP-2)

Centers
 Dick Hightower, SMU (AP-1, UP-1)
 Leo Stonestreet, Rice (AP-2)

Key
AP = Associated Press, "selected for the Associated Press by the seven coaches"

UP = United Press

Bold = Consensus first-team selection of both the AP and UP

See also
1950 College Football All-America Team

References

All-Southwest Conference
All-Southwest Conference football teams